The 2005–06 season was Reading's 135th year in existence and fourth consecutive season in the Championship, since their promotion from the Second Division in 2002, and covers the period from 1 July 2005 to 30 June 2006. 

Reading finished the season as Champions, winning promotion to the Premier League for the first time, and registered the highest points total gained in a professional league season with 106, bettering the previous record held by Sunderland by 1 point.

Review and events

Pre-season

Transfers
Following the completion of the 2004–05 season Reading announced on 11 May that veteran duo Martin Keown and Les Ferdinand, along with Ricky Newman, Bas Savage and youngster Louie Soares would not have their contracts renewed and were free to leave the club. On 22 June striker Nicky Forster left the club after 6 years, opting to sign for Ipswich Town having turned down a new contract at Reading. He was followed in the days after by Paul Brooker and Lloyd Owusu who both moved to Brentford on free transfers. On 21 July Andy Hughes moved to Norwich City in a deal thought to be worth £500,000 and the next day Dean Morgan moved to Luton Town on a free transfer. The final summer departure from the Madejski was Shaun Goater who agreed to have his contract terminated by mutual consent on 27 July.

The first signings of the summer were Irish pair Kevin Doyle and Shane Long who joined from Cork City on 7 June. Stephen Hunt arrived from Brentford on a free transfer on 29 June and he was followed by Graham Stack who signed on a six-month loan from Arsenal on 7 July. Leroy Lita was signed from Bristol City for a then club record £1,000,000 on 14 July and on 22 July Brynjar Gunnarsson transferred from Watford for an undisclosed fee. On 2 August Chris Makin and John Oster both arrived on free transfers from Leicester City and Burnley respectively. Eric Obinna signed on a short term deal on 24 August and Reading's summer transfer business was completed by Sekou Baradji who was signed on loan from West Ham on 1 September.

August
Reading's first match in the Championship was a home game against Plymouth Argyle on 6 August and despite dominating the game Reading lost 1 – 2. Having gone one down Leroy Lita equalised with a goal on his debut but a late finish from Nick Chadwick was enough to give Plymouth all the points. On 9 August Reading faced Brighton in the first of two away games with goals in each half for Glen Little and Dave Kitson enough for a 2 – 0 victory. Reading then faced a trip north to Preston on 13 August and a came away with a comfortable 3 – 0 win thanks to a brace from Lita and a second goal in four days from Glen Little. Reading returned to the Madejski on 20 August to face Millwall in a game they won emphatically 5 – 0. Bobby Convey scored two and one each from James Harper, Kitson and Steve Sidwell completed the scoring.

Reading faced Swansea City on 23 August in the first round of the League Cup. Kitson opened the scoring on 13 minutes but an 80th-minute equaliser from Adebayo Akinfenwa saw the game go into extra times with the score at 1–1. A second goal Kitson and one for Lita in extra time were enough to earn a 3–1 victory and progress into the second round. Reading were back in league action on 27 August away at Watford though neither team could make the breakthrough and it ended 0 – 0. The last game in August saw Reading at home in the league against Burnley. Leroy Lita put Reading into the lead on 7 minutes but Burnley equalised through Ade Akinbiyi. Kevin Doyle won the match for Reading with his first goal for the club on 70 minutes with the game finishing 2 – 1.

September
After a 12-day break Reading travelled to the Ricoh Arena to face Coventry City on 10 September. A second goal in two games from Kevin Doyle was only enough for a 1 – 1 draw with Rob Page equalising in the 86th minute. Three days later Reading faced Crystal Palace at home in a game they won 3 – 2. Kevin Doyle opened the scoring for Reading but Andy Johnson equalised shortly after and Clinton Morrison then gave Palace the lead at the start of the second half. However goals from Leroy Lita and Ibrahima Sonko were enough to secure the win for Reading. Next up was the visit of Crewe on 17 September which Reading won 1 – 0 thanks to a 78th-minute header from Ivar Ingimarsson. Reading were back in Football League Cup action on 20 September with a second round home tie against Luton Town. A single John Oster goal was enough to see Reading progress to the third round. On 24 September Reading traveled to Norwich City in the Football League Championship recorded and a third straight 1 – 0 win thanks to a goal from James Harper. The final game in September was at Southampton which finished 0 – 0 with both sides having chances but failing to make the breakthrough.

Squad

On loan

Left club during season

Transfers

In

Out

Loans in

Loans out

Released

Competitions

Overview

Championship

Results summary

Results by round

Results

League table

FA Cup

Football League Cup

Squad statistics

Appearances and goals

|-
|colspan="14"|Players who left Reading during the season:

|}

Goal scorers

Clean sheets

References
General: Official Yearbook Reading FC 2006/07

Reading F.C. seasons
Reading